Daniel Hirsh (born May 18, 1982 in Milwaukee, Wisconsin) is an American film and video editor, director, cinematographer, graphic designer, actor, writer, producer and voice over artist. Hirsh has acted in and directed several World Premiere theatrical productions, and his editing work on short- and feature-length films have won awards at several festivals.  Hirsh has trained as a videographer, actor, singer, and improvisational comedian, currently continuing work in Milwaukee, New York City, Atlanta and St. Louis. Working mainly with Atlanta filmmaker and entertainer Parthiban Shanmugam, other collaborators include Wade Ballance, Philip Barrett, Kevin L. Powers, and Thomas Smugala.  Influenced by French videographer and university lecturer Pier Marton and screenwriter Richard Chapman, he has focused his career on narrative filmmaking, while also piecing together documentaries on energy healing, life after death and astral projection. He currently resides in New York City due to his interest in The New York Presbyterian Hospital which utilizes energy healing, and proximity to The Monroe Institute and University of Virginia, both of which partake in astral projection and consciousness research.

Editorial, Production, Direction and Cinematography Work
  Kent Rapeen: A True Story (2001) as Writer, Editor, Director, Producer and Cinematographer
  Highly Experimental (2001) as Writer, Editor, Director, Producer and Cinematographer
  The Writer (2002)  as Writer, Editor, Director, Lighting Technician, Producer and Cinematographer
  As The World Turns (Episode #1.11867, 2002) as Production Assistant
  Between Lust and Brookings Drive (2003)  as Editor, Trailer Editor and Assistant Camera
  With Only a Belle (2004) as Editor
  Chosen (2004) as Editor
  Apocalypse and the Beauty Queen (2005) as Editor, Title Designer and Titles & Opticals
  Shadow (2007) as Editor and Trailer Editor
  Insanity du Jour (2007) as Off-Line Editor
  How's Your Cart (2007) as Editing Consultant
  The HusBand (2008) as Editor, Trailer Editor and First Assistant Camera
  Motion Music (2008) as Editor, Assistant Camera and Casting Director
  Spectre (2008) as Editor and Cinematographer
  Patriot (2008) as Editor and Cinematographer
  Regret (2008) as Executive Producer
  You're Rejected (2008) as Editor, Trailer Editor, DVD Author and DVD Box Art Designer
  Even Cactus Goes to Heaven (2009) as Editor and Trailer Editor
  Bleeder (2009) as Editor and Editing Consultant
  Vendetta (2009) as Editor and Cinematographer
  Alone (2010) as Assistant Editor
  The Ballad of Robert and Harvey (2010) as Editor
  Miss Kitty & Me (2011) as Editor
  3 Cats and a Man (2012) as First Assistant Editor
  A Letter to a Terrorist (2013) as Editor
  The Little Jihadist (2014) as First Assistant Editor
  Paper Planes (2014) as Editor
  Men of a Certain Age (2017) as Editor

You're Rejected propelled Hirsh, Shanmugam and lead actor George Lee Clark to national and international recognition, winning "Official Selection" from the Filmböro Film Festival, "Honorable Mention" at the Philadelphia International Film Festival & Market, "Official Selection" at the AIAFF Film Festival, and "Official Selection" at the Philadelphia Independent Film Festival.

Film and Television Acting
  Highly Experimental (2001) as narrator
  Making Revolution (2003) as Activist
  Between Lust and Brookings Drive (2003) as The Man
  With Only a Belle (2004) as himself
  Hooch & Daddy-O (2005) as Fan
  October Road (2007) as Townie & Bartender
  You're Rejected (2008) as himself
  Van Wilder: Freshman Year (2009) as Parent of Graduate
  3 Cats and a Man (2012) as himself
  Pikuach Nefesh: Saving Daniel (2016) as himself
  Messiah (2017) as Friend 1
 Broadcast (2022) as Meredith's Assistant
 Mob Times (2022) as Mikey Hand Soap

Theatrical Acting
Hirsh's acting style has been described as amusing, comic, and quirky. His complexion and physical appearance have been compared to John Belushi, Jon Lovitz, and Steve Zissis, with a comic voice comparable to Nathan Lane's. He prefers the Practical Aesthetics school of thought, pioneered by David Mamet, William H. Macy and Robert Bella; having taken a summer intensive course there in 2004, alongside Anna Chlumsky and Lucy DeVito. He has actively participated in various other acting styles and techniques.

Hirsh starred as himself in an improvised Thesis project directed by Washington University senior Lora Ivanova in 2003. I See (You See) was a one-act play starring five actors, one of which would be audience-voted to strap a video camera to their head while playing out suggestions for improvisational scenes. The piece, mostly comic, was met with positive reception.

Hirsh's most notable performance was his portrayal of Sir Vashya Shontine in Tennessee Williams' one-act play, Me, Vashya, written in 1937 during the playwright's short tenure at Washington University. The complete script was later published in the compilation The Magic Tower and Other One-Act Plays by publisher New Directions.  Me, Vashya was performed as a World Premiere production with The Glass Menagerie as part of the Washington University in St Louis Tennessee Williams Symposium in February 2004.

Hirsh's third World Premiere production, Six Seconds in Charlack, by Washington University alumni Brian Golden premiered on April 28 of 2005. Charlack was later performed on New York City's Off-Off-Broadway circuit at the Clemente Soto Vélez Cultural Center in August 2009.

Theatrical Performances

The Wizard and the Shepherdess (1998) as narrator
All in the Timing (2001) as Don
Alice in Wonderland (2002) as Humpty Dumpty
Once in a Lifetime (2002) as Herman Glogauer
I See (You See) (World Premiere, 2003) as himself
All's Well That Ends Well (2003) as Parolles
Guys & Dolls (2003) as Nathan Detroit
School for Wives (2003) as The Notary
Me, Vashya (World Premiere, 2004) as Sir Vashya Shontine
Cabaret (2004) as Herr Schultz
Downsize (2004) as Walter
The Fantasticks (2004) as El Gallo
Six Seconds in Charlack (World Premiere, 2005) as Scoop and TSA Officer
Tick, Tick... Boom! (2005) as Stephen Sondheim
Backyard (World Premiere, 2020)

Theatrical Directorial Experience
 Tick, Tick... Boom! (2005)
 A Shave (World Premiere, 2006)

Tick, Tick... Boom! was Hirsh's first major directorial debut after Washington University secured the rights from the estate of Jonathan Larson to be the third venue in the world to produce the little-known rock musical.

A Shave was the first of a World Premiere site-specific trilogy of plays written by student Lauren Dusek and inspired by the on-campus success of Downsize by Chicago playwright Christopher Welzenbach. Downsize was staged at Washington University's Mallinkrodt Center Men's Bathroom, with a maximum of only 11 or 12 audience members viewing the show at a time. The trilogy, consisting of A Shave, A Haircut and A Song, was staged in the Washington University Small Group Housing parking lot, an on-campus apartment, and a racquetball court in the Athletic Complex, respectively.

Biographical Film

Following a divorce from Aline Gray in 2009, filmmaker Parthiban Shanmugam proposed the creation of a biographical film starring Hirsh and Atlanta singer/songwriter Debbie Aviva Kessler. The film's style would mimic My Dinner With Andre, in which the bulk of the picture was a completely improvised conversation between the two main characters, as well as footage from Hirsh and Gray's actual wedding, with a subsection devoted to Primal Therapy as the film's penultimate sequence. 3 Cats and a Man screened only once on May 17, 2012 in France. Unhappy with the outcome, Shanmugam had the film re-edited and retitled Pikuach Nefesh: Saving Daniel in 2016.

References 

1982 births
Living people
20th-century American comedians
20th-century American male actors
20th-century American writers
21st-century American comedians
21st-century American male actors
21st-century American writers
American film producers
American male comedy actors
American male comedians
American male television actors
American male writers
American male screenwriters
American television writers
Male actors from Milwaukee
Writers from Milwaukee
Filmmakers from Milwaukee
Washington University in St. Louis alumni
American male television writers
Whitefish Bay High School alumni